The 2011 EuroHockey Club Champions Cup was the 39th edition of the premier European competition for women's field hockey clubs. The pool stage and quarter finals of the tournament were held in 's-Hertogenbosch from 22 to 25 April, while the semi-finals and finals were held in The Hague from 10 to 12 June.

Den Bosch won the title for the twelfth time after defeating Leicester 4–1 in the final. The win entered Den Bosch into the record books as the equal most successful team in the competition, tied with Amsterdam.

Results

Preliminary round

Pool A

Pool B

Pool C

Pool D

Classification round

Ninth to twelfth place classification

First to eighth place classification

Quarter-finals

Semi-finals

Third and fourth place

Final

Statistics

Final standings

Lower categories

Champions Trophy (2nd division)

Challenge I (3rd division)

Challenge II (4th division)

Challenge III (5th division)

References

Club Champions Cup women
EuroHockey Club Champions Cup (women)
2010–11 in European field hockey